Suzhou railway station is a railway station of Jinghu railway and Shanghai–Nanjing intercity railway. The station is located in Suzhou, Jiangsu, China.

History

The station opened on July 16, 1906. The station's area was only 205 square metres.

In May 1936, the station's name changed to "Wuxian railway station" because Suzhou's name changed to Wuxian. In December 1937, the station changed back to "Suzhou Station" due to the Japanese invasion.

Since July 1, 2010, Shanghai–Nanjing intercity railway has been in operation; some trains from Suzhou to Shanghai take only 24 minutes. The upgrade of the station was completed with the opening of the south plaza on 5 February 2013. The upgrade included the opening of a public bus hub. The metro station was opened with Suzhou Rail Transit line 2 was opened on 28 December 2013; metro line 4 was opened on 15 April 2017.

Rail services

Suzhou station has 12 platform faces on five island platforms and two side platforms; one island platform has only one face. The original railway uses seven platform faces and three passing tracks. The intercity railway uses five platform faces and two passing tracks.

Suzhou station is served by eight groups of services to Shanghai and Ganzhou:

On some holidays, temporary EMUs start from or end at this station.

See also  
 Suzhou North railway station—on the Beijing–Shanghai High-Speed Railway, 10.5 km away from the Suzhou railway station
 Statue of Fan Zhongyan

References

External links

Railway stations in Jiangsu
Railway stations in China opened in 1906
Railway stations in Suzhou
Stations on the Beijing–Shanghai Railway
Stations on the Shanghai–Nanjing Intercity Railway